CFTA may refer to any of several free-trade agreements or free-trade areas:

 Continental Free Trade Area (see African Union)
 Canadian Free Trade Agreement
 Caribbean Free Trade Agreement (see Caribbean Community)
 UK - EU Comprehensive Free Trade Agreement (CFTA)

CFTA may also refer to:
 Campaign for the Arts, a UK charity
 Chemins de fer et transport automobile